Below is an episodic synopsis of Justice In The City, which consists of 30 episodes and broadcast on ntv7 in Malaysia and MediaCorp Channel 8 in Singapore. The synopsis is according to Singapore's synopsis.

Episodic synopsis

See also
List of programmes broadcast by ntv7
List of MediaCorp Channel 8 Chinese Drama Series (2010s)
Justice In The City

Lists of Singaporean television series episodes
Lists of Malaysian television series episodes
Lists of soap opera episodes